The village of Moy is situated between the villages of Daviot and Tomatin, in the Highland region of Scotland. It sits beside Loch Moy and used to have a railway station on the Inverness and Aviemore Direct Railway.

Rout of Moy

On 16 February 1746 Charles Edward Stuart spent the night at Moy Hall. To prevent the troops from Inverness descending on the estate in surprise during the night, Lady Anne Farquharson-MacKintosh sent Donald Fraser the blacksmith  and four other retainers to watch the road from Inverness. Sure enough, during the night several hundred Hanoverian troops were detected marching down the road. The Mackintosh defenders started beating their swords on rocks, jumping from place to place and shouting the war cries of different clans in the Chattan Confederation. Thinking that they had been ambushed, the British troops retreated leaving Inverness open for the Prince to capture the next day, an event known as the Rout of Moy. There was only one casualty of this incident; the piper for the Hanoverian troops, possibly a MacCrimmon of the famous MacCrimmon piping family, was killed.

See also
Moy Hall

External links

Notes and references

Populated places in Inverness committee area